Christopher Daniels Miller (born November 6, 1985), better known by his stage name YC, is an American rapper. He is best known for his 2011 debut single "Racks", (featuring Future), which peaked at number 42 on the Billboard Hot 100. Since then, several remixes and freestyles have been created of "Racks". His follow-up single was "I Know" (featuring Ace Hood) released later that year.

Early life 
Born in Decatur, Georgia, he was raised by his stay-at-home mom and his father, Milton Miller Sr., who worked in the aviation industry. He attended both Columbia High School and McNair High School, but dropped out and didn't graduate. Originally under the moniker Yung Chris, he shortened it to YC to avoid confusion with another rapper Young Chris.

Music career 
YC was originally signed to Block Entertainment, formally known as Yung Chris and was a member of the rap group, Block Boyz. After disbanding himself from the label and group, he decided to focus on a solo career.

He was featured in the song, "Dem Girls", which features singer Yaboythetruth. After releasing the song, he recorded "Racks", featuring Future, for his first mixtape Got Racks, which was released for free download on April 5, 2011 and received over 24 million downloads via DatPiff. "Racks" was released on April 5, 2011. The song peaked at #6 on the Hot R&B/Hip Hop Songs chart. The video was directed by R. Malcolm Jones. He performed the single at the BET Awards of 2011. The song missed the top 40, peaking at #42 on the Billboard Hot 100 and stayed on the charts for 17 weeks.

He appeared in the video "This is What I Do", from Gucci Mane's 2011  album The Return of Mr. Zone 6, with Gucci, Waka Flocka Flame, and OJ da Juiceman. Gucci Mane also appeared in the music video for "Racks". YC appeared in Waka Flocka's video for "Grove St. Party", featuring rapper Kebo Gotti.

On October 4, 2011, he made his second single "I Know" and it features Yung Booke of T.I.'s group D.O.P.E. The video was directed by Mr. Starrize and became #23 in The Billboard Hot 100. Then YC released the remix as the second single on iTunes and it features Ace Hood. This was the second time that him and Ace Hood collaborated. YC later released the video for "Like This" featuring Yung Joc and Nephew (originally titled "Fucking Around"). The video was also directed by Mr. Starrize.

On March 9, 2012, YC released another mixtape Back From Vacation, the mixtape had over 8,000 downloads. On November 9, 2012 it was announced that YC was back in the studio, working on two new mixtapes, one of them revealed to be titled Gift to the Streets.

Personal life 
YC is the father of four children, all from different women. He rarely talks about them, but has posted pictures of them on Instagram.

Discography

Mixtapes

Singles

As lead artist

Music videos

Guest appearances

References

External links
 
 

Living people
African-American male rappers
American music industry executives
People from Decatur, Georgia
Rappers from Georgia (U.S. state)
Southern hip hop musicians
1985 births
21st-century American rappers
21st-century American male musicians
21st-century African-American musicians
20th-century African-American people